Markham Fair is one of Canada's oldest country fairs, an annual event established in 1844 and hosted by the Markham, Ontario and East York agricultural society. With over 700 volunteers working on more than 70 committees, Markham Fair is the largest community-based volunteer organization in Canada. The fair and fairgrounds are owned by the  Markham and East York Agricultural Society.

The fair occurs annually on the weekend before Canadian Thanksgiving, and hosts upwards of 80,000 attendees. Approximately 3,000 exhibitors enter more than 12,000 items, which are judged and put on display during the fair. Promoting excellence through competition in this way makes fairs unique in comparison to other events.

Agricultural societies used to meet on a regular basis to discuss various concepts of agricultural improvement such as livestock development and increased grain yields. Often the society would collectively purchase a bull or seed grain, which would be made available to members only. The fall fair would then be an opportunity for the farmers to compete by showing off the fruits of their labour.
Due to increased technology and rapid communication, agricultural societies no longer find it necessary to provide this service, but the Markham Fair continues to create the forum known as the fall fair, providing the community with a showcase for talents and products in a friendly competitive spirit.

As well as the competitive displays, the community is further brought together to enjoy various forms of entertainment such as horse pull, demolition derby, tractor pull, midway rides and displays of farm animals.

The 2020 Markham Fair was cancelled due to safety concerns amid the COVID-19 pandemic. It was also cancelled in 1917–18 & 1942–44.

The 2021 Fair was held but required prepurchased tickets and physical distancing by means of one way walk through fairgrounds. Food vendors were available near the exit but carnival rides were left out.

Fairgrounds

The site has several buildings used to house trade shows and other events. A 1/2-mile track and 4 wood stables are used to store animals. To the east of the fairgrounds is Little Rouge Creek.

The original fairground was located at the present day Markham Village Library at southeast corner of Markham Road and Highway 7 (farmland of Robert Goodfellow Armstrong and Wellington Hotel). The fair moved to the current site in 1977, as the original fairground area grew less agricultural. 

The current library building was built to mimic the shape of the old Agricultural Hall that once stood at the site (along what is now Highway 7 on the south side from Washington Street to Jerman Street). A fire in 1916 burned down the new hall, ice rink and other buildings (barns). Only the rink was rebuilt (years later in 1963) on the site and currently part of the Markham Village Community Centre. The area where the track once sat are now homes with Reeves Park along Highway 48.

Events
Many shows and events are showcased throughout the duration of the fair. In previous years these shows have included:
 Agri-food Tent Shows (cooking shows)
 Gymnastics demonstration
 Freestyle Moto-Cross (FMX) Bike Demonstration
 Demolition Derby
 Tractor Pull
 Sheep Shearing Demonstration

Other events

A number of local events use the fairgrounds outside of the fair days including home shows, trade shows and warehouse sales.

Midway

World's Finest Shows runs the midway located at the West Gate of the fairgrounds.

History
The earliest recorded fair held in Markham was in 1857 at the fairgrounds then located on the South East corner of the junction of Highways 7 (Wellington Street) and 48. Prior to that, fairs were held in Unionville, Ontario in 1855 and also in Markham.

The fair attracted farm participation from east section of York County based loosely on the York East (provincial electoral district) (East York, Scarborough, Markham, Whitchurch).

In 1865 Captain William Armstrong granted  of his land for the fairgrounds to build several buildings (grandstand, track, stalls, ice rink, exhibition hall) including a single floor agricultural hall. A new two floor hall, ticket office and rink was planned in 1894 and in 1916 a fire destroyed those buildings and were later replaced with a larger Agricultural Hall (Crystal Palace) to house the fair. The massive brick  by  rink would serve as an early recreation centre.

In 1963 the fair buildings were demolished to make way for the Markham Village Cenotaph and Community Centre (including indoor ice rink). In 1977 the Fair relocated to its current site where the four-day fair is held annually on the weekend preceding Canadian Thanksgiving. The Markham Village Library was built in 1980-1981 (on land bought by the then Town of Markham in 1975) now occupies the site of the old fairgrounds and mimics the barrel vault design of the old Agricultural Hall.

Board of directors
The society is an Ontario corporation that owns and operates the fair and its properties. It is governed by a board of 24 directors, who are elected at each annual meeting for a three-year period, and six junior directors (between the ages of 18–26) who are elected annually for a one-year period. All directors are elected by members of the society who attend the annual meeting. From among the directors, the President (Chair) and two vice-presidents are elected following the annual meeting, along with a Treasurer, General Manager, and Secretary.

Mission
The mission of the society is to encourage an awareness of agriculture and to promote improvements in the quality of life of persons living in an agricultural community by:
 researching and developing programs to meet the needs of the community;
 holding annual agricultural exhibitions featuring competitions for which prizes may be awarded;
 promoting the conservation of natural resources;
 encouraging the beautification of the community; and by
 supporting and providing facilities to encourage activities to enrich the community

In addition, there are over 750 volunteers involved with the operations, which fill the board seats and form some 75 committees, which share administrative duties and the Fair operating procedures.

See also
Other Canadian annual fairs
 Canadian National Exhibition - Toronto
 Calgary Stampede - Calgary
 Edmonton K-Days - Edmonton
 Pacific National Exhibition - Vancouver
 Central Canada Exhibition - Ottawa
 Canadian Lakehead Exhibition - Thunder Bay
 Red River Exhibition - Winnipeg
 Royal Agricultural Winter Fair - Toronto
 Royal Manitoba Winter Fair - Brandon, Manitoba
 Schomberg Fair - Schomberg, Ontario
 Sooke Fall Fair - Sooke, British Columbia
 Streetsville Bread and Honey Festival - Mississauga
 Western Fair - London, Ontario

References

External links

 

Annual fairs
1844 establishments in Canada
Fairs in Ontario
Tourist attractions in Markham, Ontario
Festivals established in 1844